Renate "Reni" Erkens (later Küppers, 24 June 1909 – 22 October 1987) was a German freestyle swimmer who competed in the 1928 Summer Olympics.

She was born in Oberhausen and was the wife of Ernst Küppers and the mother of Ernst-Joachim Küppers.

In 1928 she finished fourth with the German relay team in the 4×100 metre freestyle relay competition.

She also participated in the 100 metre freestyle event and in the 400 metre freestyle event but in both she was eliminated in the first round.

External links

1909 births
1987 deaths
Sportspeople from Oberhausen
German female swimmers
Olympic swimmers of Germany
Swimmers at the 1928 Summer Olympics
European Aquatics Championships medalists in swimming
German female freestyle swimmers